Chapter 1: The State.  The first chapter of the 1997 Constitution of Fiji is titled The State.  It is divided into five sections, which summarize briefly how the nation of Fiji sees itself.

Section 1 states that "The Republic of the Fiji Islands is a sovereign, democratic state."  This underscoring of Fiji's commitment to democracy comes against the backdrop of political instability that has sometimes plagued Fiji, resulting in two coups d'état prior to the adoption of the constitution, and a third and fourth since.

Sections 2 and 3 deal with the place of the Constitution.  The Constitution is declared to be "the supreme law of the State," and laws inconsistent with it are prohibited.  In interpreting the Constitution, individual clauses are to be interpreted in the context of the Constitution as a whole, as well as the context in which the constitution was drafted. Any interpretation is required to consider any developments that may have taken place, subsequent to the adoption of the Constitution, in the understanding and promotion of particular human rights.

Section 4 establishes three official languages: English, Fijian, and Hindustani.  This was a new development; previously, only English had enjoyed official status.  Elevating Fijian and Hindustani (an umbrella term used to cover both Hindi and Urdu) to the status of official language served two purposes: it was aimed at assuaging the fears of indigenous Fijians, alarmed by the many political concessions made to Indo-Fijians (also known as Fiji Indians, or, especially in Fiji itself, as just Indians) elsewhere in this Constitution, and was also intended as a message to Indo-Fijians that they were being recognized as equal partners in the nation.

English is declared to be the language of the Constitution; translations in Fijian and Hindustani have been made, but in the case of any perceived discrepancy among the versions in the three languages, the English version prevails.

Every person (whether a Fiji citizen or not) is granted the right to communicate with any organ of government, at both the national and local level, in any of the three official languages, "either directly or through a competent interpreter."

Section 5 codifies the relationship between religion and the Fijian State.  It declares that "Although religion and the State are separate, the people of the Fiji Islands acknowledge that worship and reverence of God are the source of good government and leadership."

This statement is a compromise.  Fiji has a strong fundamentalist Christian lobby which campaigned for the Constitution to establish Christianity as the official religion of the State (and continued to agitate for a constitutional amendment to that effect).  This was completely unacceptable to many Indo-Fijians, only six percent of whom were Christians.  The debate had racial and political overtones; with some exceptions, many of those campaigning to enshrine Christianity in the Constitution were identified with movements advocating ethnic Fijian political supremacy.  Most mainstream parties on both sides of the ethnic divide, however, agreed that a constitutional clause calling for "worship and reverence of God" was broad enough to encompass interpretations acceptable to Hindus and Moslems, as well as Christians.

1997 Constitution of Fiji